Villate is a surname. Notable people with the surname include:

Blas Villate (1824–1882), Spanish general
Elio Villate (born 1957), Cuban painter
Gaspar Villate (1851–1891), Cuban composer
Juan Sebastián Villate (born 1991), Colombian footballer